Sir Charles Dalrymple, 1st Baronet was a Scottish politician.

Charles Dalrymple may also refer to:

Sir Charles Dalrymple, 3rd Baronet (1915–1971), of the Dalrymple baronets

See also
Charles Dalrymple Fergusson
Dalrymple (surname)